William Winsor may refer to:

 William C. Winsor (1876–1963), Canadian mariner and political figure in Newfoundland
 William Winsor (banker) (1819–1904), philanthropist, town treasurer, bank officer and farmer in Rhode Island